Leonardo Óscar Mas (born July 25, 1975) is a retired Argentine footballer.

He came through the youth system of Argentinos Juniors until 1993 when he made his professional debut.  Mas has played most of his career in Argentina.  He did play six months in Ecuador.  In 2005, he made the move to Chilean club Huachipato, where he played very well.  Because of his good form, in 2008 one of Chile's biggest club, Universidad de Chile, signed Mas.

Honours

Club
Deportes Iquique
 Copa Chile (1): 2010
 Primera B (1): 2010

References
 Leonardo Mas - Argentine Primera statistics at Fútbol XXI  
 Leonardo Mas at BDFA.com.ar 

1975 births
Living people
Argentine footballers
Argentine expatriate footballers
Argentinos Juniors footballers
Club Atlético Lanús footballers
Estudiantes de La Plata footballers
Chacarita Juniors footballers
Olimpo footballers
Defensores de Belgrano footballers
Universidad de Chile footballers
C.D. Huachipato footballers
C.D. Cuenca footballers
Deportes Iquique footballers
Argentine Primera División players
Expatriate footballers in Chile
Argentine expatriate sportspeople in Chile
Expatriate footballers in Ecuador
Association football midfielders
Footballers from Buenos Aires